Ataabad (also Romanized as ‘Aţāābād; also known as Gāvzan-e Torkaman) is a village in Aq Altin Rural District, in the Central District of Aqqala County, Golestan Province, Iran. At the 2006 census, its population was 4,526, in 943 families.

References 

Populated places in Aqqala County